The 2009 Rostov bus crash was a collision between a bus and a Mercedes-Benz Actros 1841LS oil tanker near Rostov-on-Don, Rostov Oblast, Russia. 21 people died, and 8 others were injured.

Incident
27 passengers were on board the bus. The drivers of both vehicles were killed. The accident happened at 12:48. 21 people were killed in the crash. 8 people were in a serious condition in hospital.

Route
The bus was on the highway route between Krasnodar and Volgodonsk. The bus had come from the town of Kurgantsy, heading towards Taganrog. The truck had crossed into the opposing lane and collided with the Ikarus 256.75 bus.

Investigation
The Ministry of Emergency Situations for the Rostov Oblast said there had been 27 passengers on board the bus. The bus had a capacity to take 45 people. An investigation was opened for the crash.

References

2009 disasters in Russia
2009 road incidents
History of Rostov Oblast
Bus incidents in Russia
July 2009 events in Russia